Anolis naufragus, the Hidalgo anole, is a species of lizard in the family Dactyloidae. The species is found in Mexico.

References

Anoles
Reptiles described in 1989
Endemic reptiles of Mexico
Taxa named by Jonathan A. Campbell
Taxa named by William W. Lamar